Mona Maris (born Mona Maria Emita Capdeville or Maria Rosa Amita Capdeville, November 7, 1903 – March 23, 1991) was an Argentine film actress.

Early life 
Mona Maris was born Mona Maria Emita Capdeville. Some sources spell her last name as Cap de Vielle, or Maria Rosa Cap de Vielle. Her mother was Spanish Basque and her father was French Catalan. 

Orphaned when she was four years old, Maris lived with her grandmother in France and was educated in a convent there, as well as in England and Germany. By the age of 19, she spoke four languages — French, German, English and Spanish.

In the April 1930 issue of Picture Play magazine, William H. McKegg wrote that Maris "has assimilated much from each country [in which she has lived]—cynical frankness of the French, the simplicity of the Germans—the romanticism of the Italians, and the independence of the English."

Film career 

Maris' ambition to become an actress originated during World War I, when she was a student in Luders, France. She and her classmates wrote, directed, and presented short plays to entertain soldiers billeted near the school. After graduation Maris begged to go to England and her mother finally relented. In England she found a woman was given much more freedom than in either Spain or South America. She traveled to England under the indirect chaperonage of an Argentine family.

Her stay was intended to last only six months, but was extended another two years. The Argentine ambassador in Berlin received a letter which led to Maris being introduced to the President of the United Film Association. Soon she journeyed to Germany, where she participated in Universum Film AG productions. She was given a screen test during which the camera was not loaded with film. A prominent director noticed Maris and offered her a five-year contract. She counseled with her grandmother, who reluctantly allowed her to accept.

Maris' screen debut was in the German film Los Esclavos del Volga, directed by Richard Eichberg. (The book Hollywood—Se Habla Español says, "Maris' film career began with the 1925 silent movie The Apache", while a 1985 Associated Press newspaper article wrote "She first appeared in the British-made movie, The Little People in 1924.") Jorge Finkielman wrote about her performance in his book, The Film Industry in Argentina: An Illustrated Cultural History: "Her portrayal of the character Tatiana showed that she was an actress who could be expected to turn out noteworthy performances."

Joseph Schenck, president of United Artists, granted her the prospect of a Hollywood career. At the time she had completed just four films in Germany. Her Hollywood film career began with the 1925 movie The Apache.

Spanish, French, and German came easily for her, but in the early years of sounds films, her English was almost unintelligible.

From 1931 to 1941, she starred in 19 Spanish-language versions of successful American pictures, which were produced by the Fox Film Company. Maris also appeared in seven English dialogue motion pictures for three studios.

In 1985, Maris described her image as an actress. "They used to hiss whenever I was on screen," she said. "I was always playing the heavy. Here (in Argentina) when they need a heavy, they get an English girl. There (in the United States), when they needed a heavy, it was the Spanish girl."

Maris remained active at age 81, in the role of French aristocrat Marie Anne Périchon de Vandeuil, "a disturbed, broken-hearted grandmother" in the film Camila (1984), which was described as "the most successful Argentine film in decades."

Personal life 
She was married twice. Her first marriage took place while she was working in Europe and dissolved before she traveled to the United States.

She began an affair with Clarence Brown in 1931, and he reportedly proposed to her. Despite multiple sources listing them as being married, they were not, and the affair ended shortly after the proposal, with Maris later saying she ended the relationship because she had her "own ideas of marriage then."

She married Herman Rick in 1960. They divorced in 1969. Maris had no children.

Death 
Mona Maris died  in her native Buenos Aires on March 23, 1991, aged 87. She is buried at La Chacarita Cemetery.

Partial filmography 

 The Apache (1925) – Lisette Blanchard
 The Prince of Pappenheim (1927) – Prinzessin Antoinette
 The Little People (1927) – Lucia Morelli
 The Prince of Pappenheim (1927) – Prinzessin Antoinette
 The Serfs (1928) – Leibeigene Tatjana, eine Waise
 Spy of Madame Pompadour (1928) – Die Zarin
 Whirl of Youth (1928)
 The Three Women of Urban Hell (1928) – May Lyssenhop
 Romance of the Rio Grande (1929) – Manuelita
 Under a Texas Moon (1930) – Lolita Roberto
 The Arizona Kid (1930) – Lorita
 One Mad Kiss (1930) – Rosario
 El precio de un beso (1930) – Rosario Montes
 Del mismo barro (1930) – Elena Neal
 A Devil with Women (1930) – Rosita Fernandez
 Cuando el amor ríe (1930) – Elvira Alvarado
 Seas Beneath (1931) – Fraulein Lolita
 The Passionate Plumber (1932) – Nina Estrados
 South of the Rio Grande (1932) – Consuela Delgado
 The Man Called Back (1932) – Lilaya
 Once in a Lifetime (1932) – Phyllis Fontaine (uncredited)
 El caballero de la noche (1932) – Lady Elena
 The Death Kiss (1932) – Mrs. Agnes Avery (uncredited)
 Le plombier amoureux (1932)
 Secrets (1933) – Señora Lolita Martinez
 Una viuda romántica (1933) – Estrella Polar
 Forbidden Melody (1933) – Peggy
 No dejes la puerta abierta (1933) – Sra. Lucrecia Delfi
 Yo, tú y ella (1933) – Laura
 White Heat (1934) – Leilani
 Kiss and Make-Up (1934) – Countess Rita
 Downward Slope (1934) – Raquel
 Un capitan de Cosacos (1934) – Olga Nicolaievna
 Tres Amores (1934) – Lola Duval
 The Singer of Naples (1935) – Teresa
 Asegure a su mujer (1935) – Rita Martin
 The Eternal Jew (1940) – Herself
 Flight from Destiny  (1941) – Ketti Moret
 Underground (1941) – Fräulein Gessner
 Law of the Tropics (1941) – Rita
 A Date with the Falcon (1942) – Rita Mara
 My Gal Sal (1942) – Countess Mariana Rossini
 Pacific Rendezvous (1942) – Olivia Kerlov
 I Married an Angel (1942) – Marika
 Berlin Correspondent (1942) – Carla
 Tampico (1944) – Dolores Garcia
 The Desert Hawk (1944, Serial) – Princess Azala
 The Falcon in Mexico (1944) – Raquel
 Heartbeat (1946) – Ambassador's Wife
 Monsieur Beaucaire (1946) – Marquisa Velasquez (uncredited)
 The Avengers (1950) – Yvonne
 La mujer de las camelias (1953)
 Camila (1984) – La Perichona (final film role)

Notes

References

Sources 
 Frederick Post, Hollywood, Tuesday Morning, August 26, 1941,p. 4
 Los Angeles Times, "Argentine Film Actress Given Welcome Here", January 1, 1929, p. A1
 Los Angeles Times, "Mona Maris Gives Recipe for Foreign Actress to Get By Successfully in Hollywood", December 29, 1929, p. B11

External links 

 
 
 
 Photographs of Mona Maris

Argentine film actresses
Argentine silent film actresses
People from Buenos Aires
Argentine people of Basque descent
Argentine people of Spanish descent
1903 births
1991 deaths
Argentine people of French descent
Deaths from lung disease
20th-century Argentine actresses
Burials at La Chacarita Cemetery
Argentine expatriates in France
Argentine expatriates in the United Kingdom
Expatriate actresses in the United States
Argentine expatriates in the United States